Bosnian Muslim paramilitary units, that is, militias or paramilitary units made up of Bosnian Muslims (Bosniaks) in war.

World War II
 
During World War II, Bosnian Muslims established numerous self-defense units. Organizers of individual groups were Muhamed Hadžiefendić, Avdaga Hasić, Hasan Gondžić, Nešad Topčić, Džemal Tanović, Omer Čengić, Avdo Ferizbegović, Ismet Bektašević, Edhem Efendić, Zulfo Dumanjić and Ibrahim Pjanić. These units are commonly known as Muslim militias, . Hoare describes them as "Muslim quisling armed formations". Most militias supported the Independent State of Croatia (NDH), a fascist puppet state of Nazi Germany governed by the Ustaše. These were mostly put under the command of the Croatian Home Guard (HD).

Green cadres, independent units based in Sarajevo, Foča, Tuzla, Bihać, active December 1941–1943, 8,000 members, led by Nešad Topčić. 
Hadžiefendić Legion, HD unit based in Tuzla, active December 1941–May 1943, 5,000–6,000 members, led by Muhamed Hadžiefendić
Huska's militia, independent unit based in Bosanska Krajina, active October 1943–May 1944, 3,000 members, led by Husein Miljković
Rogatica Muslim militia, led by Zulfo Dumanjić.
Sokolac Muslim militia, led by Ibrahim Pjanić. After Tuzla's fall in 1943, Pjanić established a "Green cadre".
Srebrenica or Bratunac Muslim militia, led by Edhem Efendić.
Zvornik Muslim militia, led by Ismet Bektašević.

Bosnian War
 
During the Bosnian War, Bosniak paramilitary forces supported an independent Bosnia and Herzegovina.

Patriotic League, established by the Party of Democratic Action (SDA) in June 1991 in preparations for the coming Bosnian War. Together with Territorial Defence Force of the Republic of Bosnia and Herzegovina, it was transformed into the Army of the Republic of Bosnia and Herzegovina.
Black Swans (Crni labudovi), active in 1992.
Green Berets (Zelene beretke), founded in Sarajevo in early 1992, made up of demobilized JNA soldiers and conscripts who were mostly ethnic Bosniaks and Bosnian nationalists. Closely tied with SDA.

See also
Army of the Republic of Bosnia and Herzegovina
Bosnian-Herzegovinian Infantry
List of Serbian paramilitary formations

References

Sources
Books
 
 
 
 

Journals

Further reading

Bosnia and Herzegovina-related lists
Bosniak history
Paramilitary organizations based in Bosnia and Herzegovina